The International Botev Prize is a prestigious Bulgarian award, presented to individuals with significant accomplishments in the field of literature. 

It was established in 1972 and is named after Hristo Botev, an iconic Bulgarian revolutionary, journalist and poet.

Awarded 
This list is incomplete. The award is presented in different categories every 5 years. The International Botev Prize was not awarded between 1986 and 1996.

1976 

  Alexey Surkov (1976)
  Nicolás Guillén (1976)
  Pierre Seghers (1976)
  László Nagy (1976)

1981 

  Rafael Alberti (1981)
  Ahmad al-Ahmad (1981)
  Miroslav Krleža (1981)
  Rasul Gamzatov (1981)

1986 

  Günter Wallraff (1986)
  Nil Hilevich (1986)
  Mario Benedetti (1986)
  Dmytro Pavlychko (1986)

1996 

  Nadine Gordimer (1996)
  Valeri Petrov (1996)

2001 

  Branko Cvetkovski (2001)
  Nikola Indzhov (2001)

2006 

  Yevgeny Yevtushenko (2006)

2008 

  Aleksandr Solzhenitsyn (2008) - exceptional award in commemoration of his death

References 
 На колене пред слънцето на свободата!, List of Botev prize laureates as well as other decorations, bearing Botev's name.
 International Botev Prize laureates

Awards established in 1972
Orders, decorations, and medals of Bulgaria
International literary awards
Bulgarian literary awards
Vratsa